Antonio Carafa (1538 – 13 January 1591) was an Italian Roman Catholic Cardinal from the House of Carafa.

Biography

Early years
Antonio Carafa was born in Naples to  Rinaldo I Carafello Carafa, a local patrician, and Giovanna  of the signori of Montefalcone. He was a relative of Pope Paul IV through whose household he gained preferment in the Roman Curia.

He studied in the University of Padua and in Naples. He entered the Roman Curia in 1555 and became a canon of the patriarchal Vatican basilica in 1558. Pope Pius IV persecuted the family of Carafa and he fled from Rome in 1561. Pope Pius V rehabilitated the Carafas and Antonio was reappointed to the canonship on 1 June 1566.

Cardinalate

He was created cardinal deacon in the consistory of in the consistory of 24 March 1568 and was opted for the deaconary of Sant'Eusebio. He was made Perfect of the Tribunal of the Apostolic Signature from 29 January 1569 until his death. Antonio Carafa participated in the Papal conclave of 1572. He was transferred to the deaconry of S. Maria in Cosmedin on 8 April 1573, then to the deaconry of S. Maria in Via Lata on 8 November 1577. He was opted for the order of the cardinal priests with the title of Sant'Eusebio on 12 December 1583. On 28 November 1584 he was appointed to the title of Ss. Giovanni e Paolo. He participated in the Papal conclave of 1585. After the death of Cardinal Guglielmo Sirleto he was named Librarian of the Holy Roman Church on 6 October 1585. Later he became Prefect of the S.C. of the Tridentine Council from 1586 until his death. He participated in the two Papal conclaves of 1590.

He died in Rome in 1591.

He was also a manuscript collector. Minuscule 864 was one of his manuscripts.

See also 
 Sixtine Vulgate

External links

1538 births
1591 deaths
16th-century Neapolitan people
16th-century Italian cardinals
Cardinals created by Pope Pius V
Members of the Sacred Congregation of the Council
Antonio
Clergy from Naples